Payson Unified School District #10 (PUSD) is a school district in Gila County, Arizona. The district serves Payson, Star Valley, and the Oxbow Estates area. The district consists of 6 schools; all are title 1 schools.

Schools

High schools
 Payson Center for Success High School (grades 9–12). Enrollment 103 as of 2016–2017.
 Payson Center for Success - Online (grades 7–12). Enrollment 23 as of 2016–2017.
Payson High School (grades 9–12). Enrollment 673 as of 2016–2017.

Junior high schools
Rim Country Middle School (grades 6–8). Enrollment 534 as of 2016–2017.

Elementary schools
Julia Randall Elementary School (grades 3–5). Enrollment 576 as of 2016–2017.
Payson Elementary School (grades KG-2). Enrollment 463 as of 2016–2017.

References

External links

 

School districts in Gila County, Arizona